Warbreccan Station is a pastoral lease that operates as a cattle station. The Thomson River runs through Warbreccan giving it  of double frontage. Currently the property occupies and area  and has a two bedroom homestead with a three bedroom unit attached to it. A separate three bedroom open plan overseers home is located close by. Numerous creeks and permanent waterholes are found throughout the country which is a mix of pebbly black soil open downs to the south and mulga land in the north. The downs are grassed with a mix of Mitchell and Flinders grasses.

In 1885 the proprietors of Warbreccan, Affleck and Simson, purchased 20,000 ewes to stock the property.

Approximately 2,380 sheep were stolen from the property in 1923 when it was owned by the Australian Pastoral Company. Three men were charged with the crime after trying to sell the stock to a nearby landowner.

The Felix Pastoral Company acquired the property in 1924 and remained owners until placing the property up for auction in 1971.

In 1936 the  station was placed on the market along with the 64,000 sheep and 15,000 head of cattle that it was stocked with. The property had a 24 stand shearing shed and 15 bores fitted with windmills.

See also
List of ranches and stations

References

Stations (Australian agriculture)
Pastoral leases in Queensland
Central West Queensland